Problematic may refer to:

 Problematic (All album), a 2000 album by punk band ALL
 Problematic with Moshe Kasher, an American late-night talk show from 2017
 Problematic, a 2007 album by Cambodian artist Chhet Sovan Panha
 "Problematic" (song), a 1983 song by Five Star
 "Problematic", a 2021 song by Bo Burnham from the special Bo Burnham: Inside

See also
 Problematica (disambiguation)
 Problem solving
 Woke culture